Appleton Oaksmith (February 12, 1825 – October 29, 1887), of Carteret County, North Carolina, was the son of Seba Smith and Elizabeth Oakes Smith. He legally adopted a port-manteau surname, combining the phonetic equivalent of his mother's middle name (Oakes) and his father's last name (Smith).

Before the Civil War, Oaksmith ventured into the shipping business, eventually purchasing several ships of his own. He had also, however, involved himself in the filibustering campaigns of General Walker in Nicaragua, actually accepting the office of secretary in Walker's new "government". As secretary he arranged for the supply of Walker's small military force and convinced James Neal, son of writer John Neal, to travel to Nicaragua in 1856 to join the effort. 

When Walker's bid for U.S. recognition failed and his militia was ousted from the country, there is mounting evidence that Oaksmith began to employ his ships in support of the Confederate states, at least in gun-running if not in the transport of slaves. In December 1861, Oaksmith was captured on Fire Island, New York and indicted for equipping a slave ship. With Lincoln's suspension of habeas corpus in effect, he was quickly jailed, and convicted in June 1862 of slave trading. He escaped from jail in Suffolk County, Massachusetts on September 11, 1862, and fled to England. His imprisonment placed the entire family in a compromised political and social position, but they vehemently maintained his innocence.

His mother, Elizabeth, would spend years seeking audiences with government officials and finally with the President of the United States to procure her son's innocence. He spent years in exile in London.

Upon his return to the U.S. after his pardon, his vision for east Bogue Banks was that of a new resort by the sea. He first chose Fort Macon, but was unsuccessful. He then turned his attention to the area which now comprises all of Atlantic Beach and a portion of east Pine Knoll Shores. He soon acquired title to all of this property in the names of two straw ladies, his wife, Augusta, and her sister, Ellen Mason. He was a representative of Carteret County in the North Carolina General Assembly in 1874.

Family
With his first wife, Isotta Rebecchini, Oaksmith had 4 children,:
Buchanan Oaksmith (died in infancy)
Elizabeth (Bessie) Oaksmith (1858–1879)
Corrine Oaksmith (1860-1879)
Peyton "Randolph" Oaksmith

After divorcing him, Isotta tried repeatedly to recover custody of their children.

With his second wife, Augusta Mason, Appleton had 8 additional children:
Theodora (1879–1960)
Geraldine (1884–1965)
Vincent (1882–1951)
Eleanor (died in infancy)
Mildred (1870–1879)
Pauline (1872–1879)
Katherine (died in infancy)
Stanley (1880–1938)

Bessie, Corrine, Mildred, and Pauline all drowned on 4 July 1879 when the family's boat capsized. Appleton and his sons, Randolph and Stanley, survived the accident. His three other children were not onboard.

References

External links
Appleton Oaksmith Papers 
Portrait

1825 births
1887 deaths
Members of the North Carolina House of Representatives
People of the American Civil War
19th-century American politicians
People from Carteret County, North Carolina